This is a timeline of Sri Lankan history, comprising important & territorial changes and political & economic events in Sri Lanka and its predecessor states. To read about the background to these events, see History of Sri Lanka.

Pre 90th century BC

80th century BC

11th century AD - 13th century AD

19th century AD

20th century AD

Notes

References 

Sri Lankan history timelines
Sri Lankan